Christine McVie is the second solo album by the English musician, singer, and songwriter Christine McVie, released in 1984.

It was McVie's first solo recording since her 1970 self-titled release (under her maiden name). It features two singles that reached the top 40 on the Billboard Hot 100, "Got a Hold on Me" and "Love Will Show Us How", which reached numbers 10 and 30, respectively. The album itself also achieved modest success in the United States, peaking at number 26 and spending 23 weeks on the Billboard 200. In the UK, the album reached number 58 on the UK Albums Chart.

Critical reception

AllMusic reviewer Stephen Thomas Erlewine retrospectively called Christine McVie "a collection of soft rock/pop and ballads that are pleasantly melodic and ingratiating." However, he also commented that McVie's songs are too lacking in variety to be completely effective outside the context of a Fleetwood Mac album. The album received generally mixed reviews from critics upon its release, mostly due to the same reasons as above.

Track listing

Personnel
 Christine McVie – lead vocals, backing vocals, keyboards, percussion
 Todd Sharp – guitars, backing vocals
 George Hawkins – bass, backing vocals
 Steve Ferrone – drums, percussion

Additional musicians
 Steve Winwood – synthesizers (4, 5, 6, 10), lead vocals (4), backing vocals (4, 5), synth piano (5)
 Eddy Quintela – additional keyboards (10)
 Eric Clapton – lead guitar (2)
 Lindsey Buckingham – backing vocals (2, 7, 10), guitar (3, 6), lead guitar (10)
 Mick Fleetwood – drums (5)
 Ray Cooper – percussion (2, 3, 5, 10)

Production
 Russ Titelman – producer 
 David Richards – engineer 
 Toby Ellington – second engineer 
 Larry Franke – second engineer 
 Thomas P. Price Jr. – second engineer 
 Elliot Scheiner – mixing 
 A & R Recording (New York City, New York) – mixing location 
 Ted Jensen – mastering 
 Sterling Sound (New York City, New York) – mastering location 
 Patrick Byrne – equipment 
 Kimberly Boyle – production coordinator 
 Chris Kable – production coordinator 
 Mary Melia – production coordinator 
 Jeffrey Kent Ayeroff – art direction 
 Larry Vigon – art direction, cover design 
 Brian Griffin – cover photography 
 Sam Emerson – inner sleeve photography
 Tracks 1, 2, 4, 6, 8 & 10 published by Alimony Music/Cement Chicken Music.  Track 7 published by Alimony Music/Cement Chicken Music/Doumaditties.  Track 3 published by Alimony Music/Cement Chicken Music/Billy Beau Music.  Track 5 published by Alimony Music/Cement Chicken Music/Island Music Ltd.  Track 9 published by Alimony Music/Cement Chicken Music/Itsall Music.

Chart positions

References

External links
 

1984 albums
Christine McVie albums
Albums produced by Russ Titelman
Warner Records albums